Shake Hands with Shorty is the debut studio album by American band North Mississippi Allstars. It was released on May 9, 2000, through Tone-Cool Records. It features contributions from Cedric and Garry Burnside, Othar Turner, Jim Dickinson, Jimmy Crosthwait, Richard "Hombre" Price, Alvin Youngblood Hart, Steve Selvidge, Jimbo Mathus, Tate County Singers, Stu Cole and Greg Humphreys. Recording sessions took place in 1999 at Zebra Ranch Studios in Tate County, Mississippi, except for Price's bass part on the song "K.C. Jones (On The Road Again)" was recorded at House of Bob. Production was handled by Cody and Luther Dickinson.

The album won a Blues Music Award for Best New Artist Debut at the 22nd W.C. Handy Blues Awards. It also was nominated for a Grammy Award for Best Contemporary Blues Album at the 43rd Annual Grammy Awards, but lost to Taj Mahal & The Phantom Blues Band's Shoutin' in Key.

Track listing

Sample credits
Track 1 contains samples from Othar Turner and the Rising Star Fife and Drum Band 1997 album Everybody Hollerin' Goat

Notes
Track 10 includes a hidden track starting at 9:17 and lasts until 16:15 (total time 6:58)

Personnel 
 Cody Dickinson – drums, samplers, guitars (tracks: 1, 7, 10), vocals, producer, mixing
 Luther Dickinson – electric guitar, acoustic guitar, slide guitar, lap steel guitar, mandolin, vocals, producer, mixing, cover photo
 Chris Crew – bass, vocals
 Garry Burnside – bass (tracks: 6, 10)
 Cedric Burnside – drums (tracks: 6, 10)
 Othar Turner – cane fife
 Jim "East Memphis Slim" Dickinson – piano
 Jimmy Crosthwait – washboard
 Richard "Hombre" Price – bass (track 7)
 Gregory Edward Hart – guitar solo (track 2)
 Steve Selvidge – guitar solo (track 2)
 Jimbo Mathus – harmony guitar (track 4), background vocals (track 7)
 Tate County Singers – background vocals
 Stu Cole – background vocals (track 7)
 Greg Humphreys – background vocals (track 7)
 Kevin Houston – recording
 Chris Ludd – mastering
 Chapman Baehler – band photos
 Steve Davis – photography
 Diane Menyuk – graphic design
 Tracy Kane – graphic design
 Larry Brown – liner notes
 Michael Lembo – management
 Lisa Weeks – management

References

External links 

2000 debut albums
North Mississippi Allstars albums